Joseph Peter Lesley (September 17, 1819 – June 1, 1903) was an American geologist.

Biography
Peter Lesley was born in Philadelphia, Pennsylvania on September 17, 1819. It is recorded by Sir Archibald Geikie that he was christened Peter after his father and grandfather, and at first wrote his name Peter Lesley, Jr., but disliking the Christian appellation that had been given to him, he eventually transformed his signature by putting the J. of Junior at the beginning.  He graduated from the University of Pennsylvania in 1838, where he was trained for the ministry. Subsequently, he spent three years assisting Henry D. Rogers in the first geological survey of Pennsylvania.

On the termination of the survey in 1841, he entered Princeton Theological Seminary while also assisting Professor Rogers in preparing the final report and map of Pennsylvania.  He graduated from the seminary in 1844, and in April of that year he was licensed to preach by the presbytery of Philadelphia. A month later he left for Europe where he studied at the University of Halle, returning to the United States in 1845. He then worked for two years for the American Tract Society, and at the close of 1847 he joined Professor Rogers again in preparing geological maps and sections at Boston. He then accepted the pastorate of the Congregational church at Milton, Massachusetts. He remained there until 1851, when, his views having become unitarian, he abandoned the ministry, returned to Philadelphia, and entered into practice as a consulting geologist.

He made extensive and important researches in the coal, oil, and iron fields of the United States and Canada and became State geologist of Pennsylvania in 1874.  From 1872 to 1878 he served as professor of geology at the University of Pennsylvania; after 1886 he was emeritus professor.  The year 1863 he spent in Europe, examining the Bessemer ironworks in Sheffield for the Pennsylvania Railroad Company, and in 1867 he was one of ten commissioners sent by the United States Senate to the World's Fair in Paris.

Lesley was elected to the American Philosophical Society in 1856. He later served as the Society's secretary and librarian from 1858 till 1885, and during that time prepared a catalogue of its library in three volumes (1863, 1866, and 1878). He was also a member of various other scientific societies, and was one of the original members of the National Academy of Sciences. In 1884 he was president of the American Association for the Advancement of Science.

Lesley was a proponent of the high antiquity of humankind; "My own belief is but the reflection of the growing sentiment of the whole geological world [...] that our race has been upon the earth for hundreds of thousands of years."

Family
His wife, Susan Inches Lesley (1823-1904), was the daughter of Judge Joseph Lyman, of Northampton, Massachusetts, and Anne Jean Lyman (née Robbins), daughter of Edward Robbins. She married Prof. Lesley in 1849, and devoted herself to the work of organized charities in Philadelphia. She published Memoirs of Mrs. Anne J. Lyman (Cambridge, 1876; 2d ed., entitled Recollections of My Mother, Boston, 1886). The couple's daughter was the painter Margaret Lesley Bush-Brown, whose first job was creating geological models for her father.

Peter Lesley died from a stroke at his home in Milton, Massachusetts on June 1, 1903.

Works

Besides many reports and numerous papers in scientific magazines, he published:
  
 Manual of coal and its topography: illustrated by original drawings, chiefly of facts in the geology of the Appalachian region of the United States of North America (1856) 
 Guide to the iron works of the United States (1858) 
 The iron manufacturer's Guide to the furnaces, forges and rolling mills of the United States (1859)
 Report on the Embreeville Iron Property, East Tennessee (1873)
 A map and profile of a line of levels along Slippery Rock Creek (1875)
 Historical Sketch of Geological Explorations in Pennsylvania (1876)
 Man's origin and destiny: sketched from the platform of the sciences, in a course of lectures delivered before the Lowell Institute, in Boston, in the winter of 1865-6 (1868, 2. ed. 1881)

References

  which in turn cites memoirs by:  
Sir A. Geikie in Quart. Journal Geol. Soc. (May 1904)
B. S. Lyman in Trans. Amer. Inst. Mining Engineers, xxxiv. (1904) p. 726 (printed in advance with portrait, and afterwards in abstract only).

Further reading
 Mary Lesley Ames: Life and Letters of Peter and Susan Lesley (two volumes, New York, 1909)
 J. Peter Lesley Papers, 1819-1903, Sophia Smith Collection, Smith College.

External links
 J. Peter Lesley Papers from the American Philosophical Society
 
Papers of Susan Inches Lyman Lesley and J. Peter Lesley form part of the Ames family historical collection, Schlesinger Library, Radcliffe Institute, Harvard University.

1819 births
1903 deaths
Scientists from Philadelphia
University of Pennsylvania faculty
American geologists
American science writers
Martin Luther University of Halle-Wittenberg alumni
University of Pennsylvania alumni
People from Milton, Massachusetts
Members of the United States National Academy of Sciences